Caughley Beach is the northernmost beach on the ice-free coast south-west of Cape Bird, Ross Island, Antarctica. It was mapped by the New Zealand Geological Survey Antarctic Expedition, 1958–59, and named for Graeme Caughley, biologist with the party that visited Cape Bird.  New College Valley, Antarctic Specially Protected Area (ASPA) No.116, lies above the beach.

Important Bird Area
A 103 ha site at Caughley Beach has been designated an Important Bird Area (IBA) by BirdLife International because it supports a colony of about 40,000 breeding pairs of Adélie penguins, the largest of three at Cape Bird.

References

External links
 

Important Bird Areas of Antarctica
Penguin colonies
Beaches of Antarctica
Landforms of Ross Island